Mallosoma piptadeniae is a species of beetle in the family Cerambycidae. It was described by Giacomel in 1976.

References

Heteropsini
Beetles described in 1976